James Bostock (28 April 1874 – 6 February 1948) was a British sports shooter. He competed in the team 300 metre free rifle event at the 1908 Summer Olympics.

References

1874 births
1948 deaths
British male sport shooters
Olympic shooters of Great Britain
Shooters at the 1908 Summer Olympics
Sportspeople from Stoke-on-Trent